Alice Carmichael Harris (born November 23, 1947) is an American linguist. She is currently Professor of Linguistics at the University of Massachusetts Amherst, where she has been employed since 2009.

Research
Citing an early interest in the “systematic, almost mathematical aspects of languages,” Harris began investigating ergativity in graduate school, and in doing so began to study the Georgian language. She was one of the first Americans allowed to do research in the Republic of Georgia when it was still part of the Soviet Union. She has continued to work in this region, looking at different characteristics of Georgian, Laz, Svan, Mingrelian, Udi, and Batsbi.

Harris also has a strong interest in promoting the larger topic of documenting endangered languages. She played a key role in establishing the Documenting Endangered Languages (DEL) Program, a granting sub-unit that is part of the National Science Foundation.

Career
Harris received her Ph.D. in Linguistics from Harvard University in 1976 after studying at Randolph-Macon Woman's College, the University of Glasgow and the University of Essex.

She taught at Vanderbilt University from 1979–2002, serving as the department chair of Germanic and Slavic Languages there from 1993–2002. She was Professor of Linguistics at SUNY Stony Brook from 2002–2009, before taking up a position at the University of Massachusetts, Amherst in 2009.

Awards

In 1998, a book she co-wrote in 1995 with Lyle Campbell won the Leonard Bloomfield award from the LSA, an award given out every two years to a book that makes an outstanding contribution to the understanding of languages or linguistics.  
Harris received a Guggenheim Fellowship in 2009.
She was elected a Fellow of the Linguistic Society of America in 2012.
She served as President of the Linguistic Society of America in 2016.
Harris was elected Fellow of the British Academy in July 2020.

Publications
1981. Georgian Syntax: A Study in Relational Grammar. Cambridge: Cambridge University Press. Reprint published 2009.
1982. "Georgian and the unaccusative hypothesis." Language.
1985. Diachronic Syntax: The Kartvelian Case (Syntax and Semantics, 18). New York: Academic Press.
1991. "Mingrelian." The indigenous languages of the Caucasus. Volume 1: The Kartvelian languages, 313–394. Delmar, New York: Caravan Books.
1995. Alice C. Harris and Lyle Campbell. Historical Syntax in Cross-Linguistic Perspective. Cambridge University Press. [Leonard Bloomfield Book Award 1998. Chinese translation published in 2007.]
2000. "Where in the word is the Udi clitic?" Language.
2002. Endoclitics and the Origins of Udi Morphosyntax. Oxford: Oxford University Press.
2003. "Cross-linguistic Perspectives on linguistic change." The Handbook of Historical Linguistics.
2008. "Reconstruction in syntax: reconstruction of patterns." Principles of syntactic reconstruction. G. Ferraresi, and M. Goldbach, eds. John Benjamins.
2017. Multiple Exponence. Oxford: Oxford University Press.

References

External links
 Faculty web page
 Linguist list

1947 births
Living people
Linguists from the United States
Women linguists
Harvard Graduate School of Arts and Sciences alumni
Vanderbilt University faculty
University of Massachusetts Amherst faculty
Kartvelian studies scholars
Linguists of Caucasian languages
Linguists of Kartvelian languages
Linguistic Society of America presidents
Fellows of the Linguistic Society of America
20th-century linguists
20th-century American academics
21st-century linguists
21st-century American academics